Sir John Acland, 1st Baronet (c. 1591 – 24 August 1647) of Acland in the parish of Landkey and of Columb John in Devon, England, was a Royalist commander in the Civil War, during the early part of which he maintained a garrison for the king on his estate of Columb John. He was created a baronet in 1644 for his support, but the letters patent were lost or never finalised and the dignity was not confirmed until 1677/8, long after his death. He compounded with Parliament for his estate in 1646 and died the following year.

Origins
Acland was the son of Sir Arthur Acland (died 1610) of Acland by his wife Eleanor Mallet, daughter and heiress of Robert Mallet of Wooleigh in the parish of Beaford, Devon. He succeeded his grandfather Hugh Acland (c. 1543 – 1622) of Acland, whom his father had predeceased.

Career
He moved his residence from Acland to Columb John, the former seat of his great-uncle Sir John Acland (died 1620). He was Sheriff of Devon in 1641. On 19 July 1642, before the start of the Civil War, he was appointed by King Charles I as one of 28 Commissioners of Array for Devon. He raised two regiments for the King and by the summer of 1643 the garrison at his estate of Columb John was the only one remaining in Devon for the King, until the capture of Exeter. He was rewarded with a baronetcy, "of Columb John in the County of Devon", granted on 24 June 1644; but the letters patent were destroyed in the War, or never passed the Great Seal to be enrolled, so that the grant was not confirmed until 1677/8. The title was allowed to drop by his successors until the accession of his fourth son Sir Hugh Acland, 5th Baronet. After the reversal of Royalist fortunes in the Westcountry, Acland was at length compelled to cease resistance. General Fairfax made Columb John his headquarters while besieging Exeter in 1645/6, which city surrendered on terms on 9 April 1646. Acland was included in the surrender, and Fairfax recommended that the House of Commons offer him a moderate composition for his estate. His fine was set in July 1646 at £1,727, half of which he paid in August and obtained a suspension of the sequestration. However, he suffered from the attentions of Richard Evans, a brewer of Exeter, who obtained a re-sequestration of the estate for damages due to him. Acland fell ill and died on 24 August 1647; his original fine was accepted in June 1648 and the sequestration was overturned.

Marriage and children
In about 1625 he married his step-sister Elizabeth Vincent, daughter of Sir Francis Vincent, 1st Baronet (1568–1640) of Stoke d'Abernon in Surrey, by his first wife Sarah Paulet. Acland's mother Eleanor Mallet became Vincent's third wife, having survived her first husband Sir Arthur Acland (died 1610). By his wife he had children including:
Arthur Acland (bap. 1625 – 1631), died young.
Francis Acland (1626/7), died an infant
Sir Francis Acland, 2nd Baronet (died 1649), eldest surviving son and heir, who survived his father only briefly.
Sir John Acland, 3rd Baronet (c. 1634 – 1655), heir to his elder brother.
Robert Acland (died 1655/6), matriculated at Exeter College, Oxford on 27 November 1652.
Sir Hugh Acland, 5th Baronet (c. 1639 – 1714)
Charles Acland (d. bef. 1651), died without children.
Susan or Susanna Acland (c.1634 – 5 February 1696/7), married firstly Edward Halsall, equerry to Queen Catherine, and secondly John Carleton (died 1709)
Eleanor Acland (bap. 1622 – bef. 1647), who married Sir John Davie, 2nd Baronet
Elizabeth Acland (bap. 1624 –  bef. 1647)

Death and burial
Acland died on 24 August 1647 and was buried in Stoke D'Abernon Church in Surrey. At the north-west of the chancel floor survives his ledger stone inscribed: "Sir John Ackland, of Ackland, in the county of Devon, Barronett".

Ancestry

Notes

References

1590s births
1647 deaths
John 1591
Baronets in the Baronetage of England
Cavaliers
High Sheriffs of Devon